The Nickel Project is a nickname for a transportation funding package enacted in 2003 by the Washington State Legislature. The slogan for the package is "It’s your Nickel, Watch it Work."

The $3.9 billion program is funded by the following:

 5 cents per gallon gas tax increase 
 15% increase in gross weight fees on heavy trucks 
 0.3% increase in the sales tax on motor vehicles

There are 158 projects over a 10-year period. The largest portion of the project is congestion relief with $2.6 billion allocated.

External links
 Nickel Funding Project at WSDOT

Transportation in Washington (state)